Romans 2 is the second chapter of the Epistle to the Romans in the New Testament of the Christian Bible. It is authored by Paul the Apostle, while he was in Corinth in the mid-50s AD, with the help of an amanuensis (secretary), Tertius, who adds his own greeting in Romans 16:22. Although "the main theme of the Epistle [is] the doctrine of justification by faith", in verse 6 Paul "lays down with unmistakable definiteness and precision the doctrine that works, what a man has done, the moral tenor of his life, will be the standard by which he will be judged at the last day".

Text
The original text was written in Koine Greek. This chapter is divided into 29 verses.

Textual witnesses
Some early manuscripts containing the text of this chapter are:
Papyrus 40 (~250; extant verses 1–3)
Papyrus 113 (3rd century; extant verses 12–13, 29)
Codex Vaticanus (325–350)
Codex Sinaiticus (330–360)
Codex Alexandrinus (400–440)
Codex Ephraemi Rescriptus (~450; extant verses 1–4)

Old Testament references
 Romans 2:6 references Psalm 62:12 and Proverbs 24:12
  Romans 2:24 references Isaiah 52:5 and Ezekiel 36:22
 Romans 2:29 references Deuteronomy 10:16 and Deuteronomy 30:6

Analysis
Paul's rhetoric style here and other parts of the epistle (cf. Romans 3:1-9;
3:27–4:25; 9:19–21; 10:14–21; 11:17–24; 14:4–12) resembles the diatribe, a form of argumentation by 'debating' an imaginary opponent (as common among Cynic or Stoic philosophers), such as responding to objections using the expression "by no means!" (cf. Romans 3:4, 6, 31; 6:2,15; 7:7,13; 9:14; 11:1, 11) to 'pull' the reader into the 'conversation' on Paul's side. Unlike in Romans 2:17–3:20 where Paul plainly addresses a Jewish interlocutor, the dialogue partner in verses 1–16 is not explicitly identified, but the whole section of Romans 2:1–3:20 "speaks to perceived Jewish attitudes".

No partiality with God

Verse 11 

 Cross-reference verse 11 with Deuteronomy 10:17 and Acts 10:34

Circumcision
Paul refers to circumcision as a physical mark of Jewish identity, but for a Jew who breaks the law it becomes a sign of contradiction: "your circumcision has become uncircumcision" (Romans 2:25). The prophet Jeremiah had spoken of those who were "circumcised yet uncircumcised" (Jeremiah 9:25). Paul reiterates the teaching of Moses that:

Drawing on Moses' words in Deuteronomy 30:6:

See also
 Torah
 Related Bible parts: Deuteronomy 10, Psalm 62, Proverbs 24, Isaiah 52, Ezekiel 36, Acts 10

References

Sources

External links
 King James Bible - Wikisource
English Translation with Parallel Latin Vulgate
Online Bible at GospelHall.org (ESV, KJV, Darby, American Standard Version, Bible in Basic English)
Multiple bible versions at Bible Gateway (NKJV, NIV, NRSV etc.)

02